Parachemmis is a genus of corinnid sac spiders first described by Arthur M. Chickering in 1937 as a genus of ground spiders. It was transferred to Liocranidae in 1969, and to Corinnidae in 1994.

Species
 it contains four species in Central and South America:
Parachemmis fuscus Chickering, 1937 (type) – Panama
Parachemmis hassleri (Gertsch, 1942) – Guyana
Parachemmis julioblancoi Martinez-G & Villarreal, 2017 – Colombia
Parachemmis manauara Bonaldo, 2000 – Brazil

References

Araneomorphae genera
Corinnidae
Spiders of Central America
Spiders of South America